The Adventures of Dr. Fu Manchu is a syndicated American television series that aired in 1956.  The show was produced by Hollywood Television Service, a subsidiary of Republic Pictures.

Cast and characters
 Glen Gordon as Dr. Fu Manchu
 Lester Matthews as Sir Denis Nayland Smith
 Clark Howat as Dr. John Petrie
 Carla Balenda as Nurse Betty Leonard
 Laurette Luez as Karamaneh
 John George as Kolb.

Production

Development
Early in the 1950s, an NBC pilot starring John Carradine and Cedric Hardwicke was made, but the sponsors were disappointed in the scripts, and the TV series never materialized.

In 1955, Republic Pictures paid US$4 million to Sax Rohmer and announced they would film 78 episodes, but only 13 were made following a protracted court battle over the rights between Rohmer and the producers.

Details
Each episode would start off with Dr. Fu Manchu and Nayland Smith playing a game of chess with the narrator telling us, "Black and white. Life and death. Good and evil. Two sides of a chess game. Two forces of the universe, one magnificent, the other sinister. It is said the devil plays for men's souls. So does Dr. Fu Manchu, Satan himself, evil incarnate." At the end of each episode, after Nayland Smith and Dr. Petrie had foiled Dr. Fu Manchu's latest fiendish scheme, Dr. Fu Manchu would be seen breaking a black chess piece as the closing credits rolled.

The series was directed by noted serial director Franklin Adreon, as well as by William Witney. Unlike the Sherlock Holmes/Dr. Watson type relationship of the films, the series featured Smith as a law enforcement official and Petrie as a staff member of the Surgeon General.

The series was similar in some ways to a serial, but each episode ended in a resolution rather than a cliffhanger.  Republic sent out a film crew to Hong Kong to shoot background footage and supplied stock footage from its library of films.

Episodes

Feature films
Several of the episodes were put together into feature films that were released in Germany.

References

External links
 
 
 
 

1956 American television series debuts
1956 American television series endings
1950s American television series
Black-and-white American television shows
Espionage television series
Television shows based on British novels
Television series by CBS Studios
First-run syndicated television programs in the United States
Fu Manchu
Television shows filmed in Hong Kong